Zrinski Park is situated in downtown Čakovec, northern Croatia, close to the central square.

The area had been a part of the city fortification since the 13th century. The castle, located in the centre of the Park, was owned by the Zrinski family between the 16th and the 18th century. It is known today as the "Old Town of the Zrinskis" and is an important landmark.

Gallery

References
 

Parks in Croatia
Čakovec
Tourist attractions in Međimurje County